Pachysphaerolaelaps is a genus of mites in the family Pachylaelapidae. This genus has a single species, Pachysphaerolaelaps calcariger.

References

Acari
Animals described in 1902